Artim Šakiri (born 23 September 1973) is a Macedonian football manager and a former midfielder from North Macedonia. While managing Kukësi in 2014, Šakiri was ranked as the best manager of the Kategoria Superiore and the second best manager of Albanian origin in the world.

Biography
Šakiri was born to an Albanian family in Livada, a village near Struga. In his youth, he played football for his village squad (FK Dinamo Livada).

Club career 
In 1997, he moved from Vardar to Swedish side Halmstads BK, a team that won the Swedish premier league Allsvenskan the same year. He played alongside developing star Freddie Ljungberg.

In 2003, he moved from Bulgarian club CSKA Sofia to West Bromwich Albion in England. He made his debut in a 4–1 defeat away at local rivals Walsall. In his first home league match for Albion, Šakiri scored a spectacular long-range goal, helping his team to a 4–1 win over Burnley. It was, however, his only goal for the club. He made 30 appearances during 2003–04, but the next season he only played three games and left the club. He was set to move to Burnley, but the move fell through as his work permit wasn't renewed. Instead, Šakiri went to AaB in Denmark. He was released by AaB in 2006. In Autumn 2006, Šakiri signed for Finnish club FC Inter. He made five Veikkausliiga appearances and scored three times, but his contract was not renewed. In 2007, he signed for FC Vaduz. At the beginning of the season 2008 he has signed for Azerbaijani side Qarabağ FK.

Career statistics

International career 
Šakiri made his debut for Macedonia in a May 1996 friendly match against Bulgaria, coming on as a second half substitute for Sašo Miloševski, and has been capped 73 times, scoring 15 goals. He has been captain of the team for many of those years. In 2002, during UEFA Euro 2004 qualifying, he scored a goal directly from a corner kick against England.

His final international was a November 2006 European Championship qualification match against Russia.

International goals

Coaching career
He was hired as a manager of Swiss Challenge League club FC Schaffhausen on 1 September 2021. He was not able to obtain the Swiss work permit in a prompt manner, and on 17 September the club hired a different manager.

Honours
FK Vardar
 First League: 1994–95
 Macedonian Cup: 1994–95, 1998–99

Halmstad
 Allsvenskan: 1997

CSKA Sofia
 A Group: 2002–03

Qarabağ
 Azerbaijan Cup: 2008–09

References

External links 
 
 Artim Šakiri at MacedonianFootball.com
 

1973 births
Living people
People from Struga Municipality
Albanian footballers from North Macedonia
Association football midfielders
Macedonian footballers
North Macedonia international footballers
FK Karaorman players
FK Vardar players
Halmstads BK players
Tennis Borussia Berlin players
ND Gorica players
NK Korotan Prevalje players
Malatyaspor footballers
PFC CSKA Sofia players
West Bromwich Albion F.C. players
AaB Fodbold players
FC Inter Turku players
FC Vaduz players
KF Shkëndija players
Besa Kavajë players
Qarabağ FK players
Macedonian First Football League players
Allsvenskan players
2. Bundesliga players
Slovenian PrvaLiga players
Süper Lig players
First Professional Football League (Bulgaria) players
Premier League players
English Football League players
Danish Superliga players
Veikkausliiga players
Swiss Challenge League players
Kategoria Superiore players
Azerbaijan Premier League players
Macedonian expatriate footballers
Expatriate footballers in Sweden
Macedonian expatriate sportspeople in Sweden
Expatriate footballers in Germany
Macedonian expatriate sportspeople in Germany
Expatriate footballers in Slovenia
Macedonian expatriate sportspeople in Slovenia
Expatriate footballers in Turkey
Macedonian expatriate sportspeople in Turkey
Expatriate footballers in Bulgaria
Macedonian expatriate sportspeople in Bulgaria
Expatriate footballers in England
Macedonian expatriate sportspeople in England
Expatriate footballers in Finland
Macedonian expatriate sportspeople in Finland
Expatriate footballers in Albania
Macedonian expatriate sportspeople in Albania
Expatriate footballers in Liechtenstein
Expatriate footballers in Azerbaijan
Macedonian expatriate sportspeople in Azerbaijan
Macedonian football managers
FK Shkëndija managers
FK Kukësi managers
KF Flamurtari managers
FC Schaffhausen managers
Macedonian expatriate football managers
Expatriate football managers in Albania
Expatriate football managers in Switzerland
Kategoria Superiore managers